Chokwe may refer to:
Chokwe people, a Central African ethnic group
 Chokwe language, a Bantu language
 Chokwe or Tshokwe, Botswana, a village
Chokwe, Malawi
Chókwè District, Mozambique
Chokwe, Mozambique, a town and capital of the district

Language and nationality disambiguation pages